The Field of Honor is a 1917 American silent drama film directed by Allen Holubar and starring Holubar, Frank MacQuarrie and Louise Lovely.

Cast
 Allen Holubar as Wade Clayton
 Frank MacQuarrie as Amos Tolliver
 Sydney Deane as Poole 
 Louise Lovely as Laura Sheldon
 Helen Wright as Laura's Mother
 Millard K. Wilson as George Baring

References

Bibliography
 Robert B. Connelly. The Silents: Silent Feature Films, 1910-36, Volume 40, Issue 2. December Press, 1998.

External links
 

1917 films
1917 drama films
1910s English-language films
American silent feature films
Silent American drama films
American black-and-white films
Universal Pictures films
Films directed by Allen Holubar
1910s American films